Shri Govind Guru University is a state university located at Godhra, Gujarat, India. It was established in 2015 by the Shri Govind Guru University Act, 2015 of the Government of Gujarat and approved by the University Grants Commission (UGC) in 2016. The university has jurisdiction over the districts of Panchmahal, Mahisagar, Dahod, Chhota Udaipur and Vadodara in eastern Gujarat with 122 affiliated colleges. It is named after social and religious reformer Govind Guru.

References

External links

Universities in Gujarat
Panchmahal district
Educational institutions established in 2015
2015 establishments in Gujarat